Ever since the 2007 municipal reform, and prior to this election, the election results had led to Niels Hörup from Venstre becoming mayor. All the elections had given Venstre 8 seats. In the 2017 election, the blue bloc had won 11 seats.

However this election was quite remarkable in multiple ways. First off this would become Liberal Alliance best result in any municipality in the 2017 Danish local elections, as they won 14.9% of the vote, an 8% increase compared to 2017. This would also be the only municipal election in 2017 where no party won above 20% of the vote. The result would be very split, with 5 parties winning 3 or 4 seats. Venstre would still become the party to receive the most votes, but would lose 4 seats.

On election night, at first, it looked like the Conservatives had won the mayor's position. However to great frustration from the Conservatives, the Liberal Alliance had decided to support the Social Democrats. The day following the election, Jonas Ring Madsen from the Social Democrats could declare that he had secured the mayor's position.

On November 22, 2021, however, Emil Blücher from Liberal Alliance could announce that he would become the new mayor, as the Conservatives, Venstre and local party Havdrup Listen supported him as the new mayor.

This would mark the first mayor position of Liberal Alliance.

Electoral system
For elections to Danish municipalities, a number varying from 9 to 31 are chosen to be elected to the municipal council. The seats are then allocated using the D'Hondt method and a closed list proportional representation.
Solrød Municipality had 19 seats in 2021

Unlike in Danish General Elections, in elections to municipal councils, electoral alliances are allowed.

Electoral alliances  

Electoral Alliance 1

Electoral Alliance 2

Electoral Alliance 3

Results

Notes

References 

Solrød